"Winner" is the first single from American singer/actor Jamie Foxx's fourth studio album Best Night of My Life, released for digital download on April 6, 2010 through J Records. It features American singer Justin Timberlake and rapper T.I. Foxx told George Lopez about Timberlake's contribution: "I got him on the track—'cause he wasn't gonna get on the track—I just literally said, 'Man, my people suffered for 500 years. You owe me this.'" It was also the official theme song of the 2010 NBA Playoffs for NBA on TNT and NBA TV.

Critical reception
Allmusic considered this song a standout cut. LA Times was also positive: "Current radio staple "Winner" sets the template — big processed drums, creepy synths and lots of open space for Foxx’s capable runs." The New York Times was positive too: "On "Winner" there’s even some of the pseudo rapping that Justin Timberlake has been squeezing out of his system of late." PopMatters was negative in its review, however: ""Winner" is another song that exists in spite of Jamie, and speaks only to the depth of his pockets. (...) The chorus of "Winner" splayed across ESPN and TNT promos for basketball games." Slant Magazine panned the track: "It's this kind of careless maximalism that produces junk like "Winner", a whirring waste of a Justin Timberlake appearance, a song whose basketball theme and cheesy dribble beat sound like something ripped from High School Musical." USA Today, however, highlighted the song positively.

Chart performance
The song was released on urban radio stations on April 6, 2010, and was released on May 4, 2010 to mainstream radio stations. The song debuted at number 28 on the US Billboard Hot 100 due to strong airplay and downloads, becoming T.I.'s third and Timberlake's and Foxx's first "hot shot debut" on the chart.

Charts

References

2010 singles
Jamie Foxx songs
Justin Timberlake songs
T.I. songs
Songs written by T.I.
Song recordings produced by the Y's
Songs written by James Fauntleroy
Songs written by Justin Timberlake
J Records singles
2010 songs